Hoàng Đăng Huệ (1932–December 31, 2014) was a Major General of Ministry of Defence in Việt Nam. He was the Political Commissar of The High Command of Tank and Armour

Biography
The origin of his name is Hoàng Nguyên, born in 1932 in  Hiệp Hòa District, Bắc Giang Province. 
The participant in the War of French colonialism and American Imperialism at the age of 15 made him become the youngest attendee in the operation of the Communist Party

In the Battle of Điện Biên Phủ, he was the superior of Phan Đình Giót (a Hero of People's Armed Forces). His last position was Political Commissar, Secretary of Party Committee and Chairman of Housing and Land Board of The High Command of Tank and Armour in Việt Nam. During the time of serving in The arm of Tank and Armour, a large number of soldier showed their gratitude to General Hoàng Đăng Huệ for the support of receiving a large amount of Right Land for their living

The existence and development of Ministry of Defense was made great contribution by General Hoàng Đăng Huệ

References

1932 births
2014 deaths
Vietnamese communists
Vietnamese generals